Yakimanskoye is a rural locality (a selo) in Pavlovskoye Rural Settlement, Suzdalsky District, Vladimir Oblast, Russia. The population was 7 as of 2010. There are 8 streets.

Geography 
Yakimanskoye is located on the Nerl River, 12 km southeast of Suzdal (the district's administrative centre) by road. Braskoye-Gorodishche is the nearest rural locality.

References 

Rural localities in Suzdalsky District